Blue Haven may refer to:

Blue Haven, New South Wales, a suburb on the Central Coast of New South Wales, Australia
Blue Haven, Gauteng, a suburb of Johannesburg, South Africa